Caldera Port, in Spanish , is the main freight port in the Pacific side of Costa Rica, located in the Esparza canton of the Puntarenas province.

Description

History

After the European colonization of the area, this was the main export and import region, using boats to transport the cargo from the shore to the ships.

A proper port was then built in the needle like peninsular area on which the Puntarenas canton and downtown city is now located, starting with wood materials in the 1910s and then steel in the 1930s. By the 1960s due to the difficulty of access to the city, it was decided to build a proper port with easier access, which started construction in the 1970s and was inaugurated on 17 December 1981.

Efforts to upgrade the port capabilities are in the planning stage, with a proposed delivery date in the year 2029 for the first stage and 2045 for the second stage, with no specific objectives per stage yet, and because the contract to manage the port only includes operations and not enhancements, it has been difficult to improve the infrastructure of the port.

Access

Images

See also
 Port of Limón, operated by JAPDEVA
 Port of Moín, operated by JAPDEVA
 Moín Container Terminal, operated by APM Terminals

References

External links
 Sociedad Portuaria de Caldera

Port settlements in Central America
Transport in Costa Rica